Andreotti is an Italian surname, derived from Andrea (Andrew). Notable people with the surname include:

 Aldo Andreotti (1924–1980), Italian mathematician
Amy Andreotti, American biochemist
 Federico Andreotti (1837-1930), Italian painter
 Gérson Andreotti (b, 1953), Brazilian athlete
 Giulio Andreotti (1919–2013), Italian politician of the Christian Democracy party, former Prime Minister of Italy
 Jim Andreotti (b. 1938), Canadian professional athlete
 Lamberto Andreotti (b. 1950), Italian executive
 Libero Andreotti (1875–1933), Italian sculptor

Italian-language surnames
Patronymic surnames
Surnames from given names